Stisted is a civil parish, Church of England parish, and former manor near Braintree, Essex, England. Andrew Motion, a former Poet Laureate, was raised there.

History of Stisted
Stisted parish was a peculiar, held by the Dean of Bocking under the Archbishop of Canterbury, until 1845, when it fell under the jurisdiction of Middlesex. In 1895 it became part of the 'see' of Chelmsford.

Samuel Stone, founder of Hartford, Conn. was curate of Stisted from 1627. Charles Forster, grandfather of E. M. Forster, held the benefice of Stisted, and there is an inscription recording that "The tower was rebuilt from the foundations by Onley Savill-Onley and at the same time the chancel was new roofed and restored by the Rev Charles Forster AD 1844".

The manor of Stisted also belonged to the monks of Canterbury Cathedral before the reformation. It was sold to Thomas Wiseman in 1549, whose heirs sold it to William Lingwood in 1685, whose widow (his third wife) bequeathed it to John Savill in 1719. It was inherited by Savill's brother,
and then his niece, who married the Rev. Charles Onley, from whom Onley Savill-Onley was descended.

In 2003, Alan Hurst, the local Member of Parliament denounced an Internet land scheme for selling land in Stisted as if for development, comparing it to a Champagne auction.

References

External links

Stisted Parish Council website

Villages in Essex
Braintree District